Blazing Flowers' (literally: "Milan... to defend or to die"), is a 1978 Italian Poliziesco film co-written and directed by Gianni Martucci and starring Marc Porel, George Hilton and Anna Maria Rizzoli.

Cast 
Marc Porel as Pino Scalise
George Hilton as  Commissioner Morani
Anna Maria Rizzoli as  Marina 'Fiorella'
Al Cliver as  Domino
Barbara Magnolfi as  Teresa
Anthony Freeman as  Nosey
Guido Leontini as  Don Chicco 
Parvin Tabriz  as  Virginia Mallo
Nino Vingelli as  Nicola

Reception
In Italy, the film was distributed by Lark and it grossed 593,395,110 lire.  

In his analysis of the film, Roberto Curti heavily criticized it, noting "the film's half-baked plot, filled with clichés worthy of a bad sceneggiata" and "the tone [...] closer to that of a lurid comic book".

See also     
 List of Italian films of 1978

References

External links

1978 films
Poliziotteschi films
1978 crime films
Films scored by Gianni Ferrio
1970s Italian-language films
1970s Italian films